Dirks is a patronymic surname ("son of Dirk"). Some variant forms are Derks, Dircks, Dirkse, Dirksen, Dirksz and Dirkx. People with this name include:

Andy Dirks (born 1986), American Major League Baseball player
Alexa Dirks (using stage name Begonia), Canadian musician
Gordon Dirks (born 1947), Canadian educator and former politician
Howard Dirks (born 1938), Canadian politician
Jane Claire Dirks-Edmunds (1912–2003), American ecologist, biologist and author
John Dirks (cartoonist) (1917–2010), American cartoonist and sculptor
John Dirks (physician) (born 1933), Canadian physician
Nicholas Dirks (born 1950), American historian and Chancellor of the University of California, Berkeley
Robert Dirks (1978–2015), American chemist 
Rudolph Dirks (1877–1968), German-American comic strip artist, known for The Katzenjammer Kids
Samantha Dirks (born 1992), Belizean sprinter
Tonnie Dirks (born 1961),  Dutch long distance runner
Walter Dirks (1901–1991), German political commentator, theologian and journalist
Dircks
Henry Dircks (1806–1873), English engineer
Dirksz
Germain Dirksz (born 1976), Aruban footballer
Lucien Dirksz (born 1968), Aruban racing cyclist

See also 
Dirks (disambiguation)
Dierckx or Dierkx, surname 
DIRKS, an Australian government methodology for record keeping

Patronymic surnames
Dutch-language surnames
Surnames from given names
Russian Mennonite surnames